Communauté d'agglomération Luberon Monts de Vaucluse is the communauté d'agglomération, an intercommunal structure, centred on the town of Cavaillon. It is located in the Vaucluse department, in the Provence-Alpes-Côte d'Azur region, southeastern France. Created in 2014, its seat is in Cavaillon. Its name refers to the Luberon and Vaucluse Mountains. Its area is 356.4 km2. Its population was 55,034 in 2019, of which 26,236 in Cavaillon proper.

Composition
The communauté d'agglomération consists of the following 16 communes:

Beaumettes
Cabrières-d'Avignon
Cavaillon
Cheval-Blanc
Gordes
Lagnes
Lauris
Lourmarin
Maubec
Mérindol
Oppède
Puget
Puyvert
Robion
Taillades
Vaugines

References

Luberon Monts de Vaucluse
Luberon Monts de Vaucluse